The 2014–15 Wichita State Shockers men's basketball team represented Wichita State University in the 2014–15 NCAA Division I men's basketball season. They played their home games at Charles Koch Arena, which has a capacity of 10,506. They were playing their 70th season as a member of the Missouri Valley Conference, and were led by eighth-year head coach Gregg Marshall. They finished the season 30–5, 17–1 in MVC play to win the regular season Missouri Valley championship. They advanced to the semifinals of the Missouri Valley tournament where they lost to Illinois State. They received an at-large bid to the NCAA tournament where they defeated Indiana in the second round and Kansas in the third round before losing in the Sweet Sixteen to Notre Dame.

Previous season
The 2013–14 season was arguably the greatest season in Wichita State's 108-year basketball history. After defeating Missouri State on March 1, 2014, Wichita State became the first Division I men's team ever to finish the regular season 31–0, the first team to finish 18–0 in conference play in the Missouri Valley Conference since the 1985–86 Bradley Braves, as well as the first to finish the regular season undefeated since Saint Joseph's in 2003–04. The team's 35–0 start is the best Division I start ever, beating the 1990–91 UNLV Runnin' Rebels who began the season 34–0 and the best Missouri Valley Conference start ever, beating the 1978–79 Indiana State Sycamores, who went 33–0 to start the season. They spent most of the season in the top 10 of both major polls, rising as high as #2 in late February.  They continued their run by winning their first MVC tournament title since 1987, and were ranked second in both final major media polls—the highest final national ranking in school history.
 
They entered the 2014 NCAA Division I men's basketball tournament undefeated at 34–0. The Shockers beat Cal Poly, 64–37 for their NCAA-record 35–game winning streak to start a season. Two days later, and playing their 5th and final straight game at St. Louis' Scottrade Center, Fred VanVleet's three-point attempt at the end-of-game buzzer against Kentucky bounced harmlessly off the rim, and so went their attempt to become the first men's team in 38 years to win the title undefeated.  The Shockers finished with the third-most wins in Division I history, and the second-most for a school not in a power conference.

Departures

In addition to the departing players, assistant Chris Jans left the Shockers immediately after the season to take the head coaching vacancy at Bowling Green.

Incoming transfers

*Player will redshirt during the season†Junior College transfer

Class of 2014 recruits

Roster

Schedule

|-
!colspan=12 style="background:#000; color:#FFC318;"| Exhibition
|-

|-
!colspan=12 style="background:#000; color:#FFC318;"| Non-conference regular season

|-
!colspan=12 style="background:#000; color:#FFC318;"| Missouri Valley Conference regular season

|-
!colspan=12 style="background:#000; color:#FFC318;"| Missouri Valley tournament
|-

|-
!colspan=12 style="background:#000; color:#FFC318;"|

Rankings

See also
2014–15 Wichita State Shockers women's basketball team

References

Wichita State Shockers men's basketball seasons
Wichita State
Wichita State Shockers men's basketball
Wichita State Shockers men's basketball
Wichita State